Events from the year 1663 in Denmark.

Incumbents 

 Monarch – Frederick III

Events 
 
 April 20 – The Danish seizure of Fort Christiansborg and Carlsborg (Cape Castle) completes the annexation of the Swedish Gold Coast settlements, the beginning of the Danish Gold Coast.

Undated 
 Peder Syv publishes Nogle Betenkninger om det Cimbriske Sprog .

Publications
 Thomas Bartholin: De pulmonum substantia et motu. Copenhagen, 1663.

Births

Deaths 
 13 January – Esaias Fleischer, pharmacist (born c. 1586) 
 27 September – John, Prince of Schleswig-Holstein (born 1584)
 27 September  Christoffer Urne, statesman and landholder (died 1593)

References 

 
Denmark
Years of the 17th century in Denmark